Haystack Rock is a  sea stack in Cannon Beach, Oregon. It is the third-tallest such intertidal structure in the world. A popular tourist destination on the Oregon Coast, the monolithic rock is adjacent to the beach and accessible by foot at low tide. The Haystack Rock tide pools are home to many intertidal animals, including starfish, sea anemone, crabs, chitons, limpets, and sea slugs. The rock is also a nesting site for many sea birds, including terns and puffins.

Location and management

The nearest major road is U.S. Route 101. Haystack Rock is part of the Tolovana Beach State Recreation Site. The area below the mean high water (MHW) level is managed by Oregon Parks and Recreation. The area above the MHW level is managed by the Oregon Islands National Wildlife Refuge of the United States Fish and Wildlife Service.

Geology
Composed of basalt, Haystack Rock was formed by lava flows emanating from the Blue Mountains and Columbia basin about 15-16 million years ago. The lava flows created many of the Oregon coast's natural features, including Tillamook Head, Arch Cape, and Saddle Mountain. Haystack Rock was once joined to the coastline but years of erosion have since separated the monolith from the coast. Three smaller, adjacent rock formations to the south of Haystack Rock are collectively called "The Needles".

Ecology
Haystack Rock was granted Marine Garden status by the Oregon Department of Fish and Wildlife in 1990. Collecting plants or animals is strictly prohibited. Climbing above the mean high tide level (barnacle line) disturbs nesting birds and is not allowed. The Haystack Rock Awareness Program is run by the City of Cannon Beach and conducts educational seminars at the rock during low tide between February and October.

Recreation

Visitors to Haystack Rock can view many species of marine wildlife in their natural habitat during low tide. The thin strip of rock and sand that connects it to the beach at these times features many tide pools. The area surrounding the rock is popular for picnicking, kite-flying, and bird-watching.

Haystack Rock is one of the most identifiable geological formations of Oregon. Many people each year become temporarily trapped on Haystack Rock when high tide engulfs the rock in water, necessitating rescue by the United States Coast Guard or local authorities. Oregon's beaches are publicly owned, and there are several hotels along the beachfront within walking distance of Haystack Rock, making the area congested with tourists during the summer.

Popular culture
 Haystack Rock can be seen prominently in the 1971 film of Oregonian Ken Kesey's novel Sometimes a Great Notion during the scene where the Stampers brawl with the union workers.
 Haystack Rock can be seen in the background of the opening scene of The Goonies, when the Fratellis are fleeing from the police and then enter a race on the beach. Later in the film Haystack Rock is seen again when Mikey is pointing out some rocks in the distance.
 Haystack Rock can be seen in the 1979 movie 1941 directed by Steven Spielberg. The rock is particularly out of place, as the setting is supposed to be the California coast.
 Haystack Rock can be seen in the movie Kindergarten Cop, during the carnival scene late in the movie.
 In the novel The Cabin at the End of the World by Paul G. Tremblay, Haystack Rock is submerged by a tsunami triggered by an earthquake off the coast of Oregon.
 In Louis Theroux's documentary Altered States: Choosing Death, Haystack Rock can be seen during an interview with a woman whose home overlooks the sea stack.

References

External links

Tolovana Beach State Recreation Site
Cannon Beach Haystack Rock Rocky Shore Management Cell from the Oregon Ocean-Coastal Management Program
Oregon Coast National Wildlife Refuge
A 1940 Oregon Coast Tour: Seaside to Bay City from the Oregon State Archives

Landmarks in Oregon
Monoliths of the United States
Oregon Coast
Rock formations of Oregon
Stacks of the United States
Pacific islands of Oregon
Landforms of Clatsop County, Oregon
Protected areas of Clatsop County, Oregon